Hayri may refer to:

Given name
 Hayri Kıvrıkoğlu (born 1948), Turkish army commander
 Hayri Pinarci (born 1991), Dutch-Turkish footballer
 Hayri Sevimli (born 1991), German-Turkish footballer
 Hayri Sezgin (1961-2013), Turkish wrestler

Middle name
 Suat Hayri Ürgüplü (1903–1981), Turkish political figure

Turkish masculine given names